Funeral Kings is a 2012 film written and directed by Kevin McManus and Matthew McManus starring Dylan Hartigan and Alex Maizus.

Plot
Two irreverent altar boys, Andy and Charlie, play hooky after every funeral they serve at their school's chapel.  This comes into conflict when the boys are teamed with a timid, new kid who is less willing to break the rules.

Cast 
 Dylan Hartigan as Andy Gilmour
 Alex Maizus as Charlie Waters
 Jordan Puzzo as David Mason
 Charles Odei as Felix Thurman
 Michaela McManus as Patricia Gilmour
 Kevin Corrigan as Iggy Vannucci

Production 
Production began in July 2010.  The McManus Brothers were inspired by their father's stories about growing up as an altar server in Catholic school.

Release 
The film was first screened in the US at the South by Southwest Film Festival on March 10, 2012. It went on general release on November 16, 2012.

Reception 
The film received an 88% "fresh" rating on Rotten Tomatoes.  John Anderson of Variety said the film was "like a John Hughes comedy with nicotine stains." He went on to say " it could become one of those films by which an age group defines itself."  Mark Olsen of The Los Angeles Times said the film was "a surprisingly sweet story about a pair of Rhode Island Catholic schoolboys, played with knockabout charm by Alex Maizus and Dylan Hartigan." He criticized the film for "its impulse toward honesty over overstatement" which he said, "robs the film of true dramatic tension."  Drew McWeeny of Hitfix wrote "'Funeral Kings' is confident and controlled and, with an unabashed vulgarity underscoring everything, about as pure a piece of movie memory as I can name."

References

External links 
 
 

2012 films
American coming-of-age films
American independent films
2012 directorial debut films
2010s English-language films
2010s American films